Can Serdar (born 2 February 1996) is a German-Turkish footballer who plays as a midfielder for Oberliga Niederrhein club FSV Duisburg.

Career
Serdar made his professional debut for Fortuna Köln in the 3. Liga on 25 July 2015, coming on as a substitute in the 74th minute for Julius Biada in the 1–2 away loss against Stuttgarter Kickers.

References

External links
 Profile at DFB.de
 
 Can Serdar at FuPa

1996 births
Footballers from Essen
German people of Turkish descent
Living people
German footballers
Germany youth international footballers
Association football midfielders
SC Fortuna Köln players
VfB Homberg players
Rot-Weiß Oberhausen players
3. Liga players
Regionalliga players
Oberliga (football) players